Sains is a commune in the Ille-et-Vilaine department in Brittany in northwestern France.

Population

Inhabitants of Sains are called sainsois in French.

Geography

The tower and spire are the work of Alfred-Louis Frangeul (his son), 1893-1894.
 The Étang du Bourg, a mesotrophic pond

See also
Communes of the Ille-et-Vilaine department

References

External links

Mayors of Ille-et-Vilaine Association 

Communes of Ille-et-Vilaine
Ille-et-Vilaine communes articles needing translation from French Wikipedia